Rosebud Sioux Tribal Airport  is a public use airport located two nautical miles (4 km) south of the central business district of Rosebud, in Todd County, South Dakota, United States. The airport is owned by the Rosebud Sioux Tribe.

Although many U.S. airports use the same three-letter location identifier for the FAA and IATA, this facility is assigned SUO by the FAA but has no designation from the IATA.

Facilities and aircraft 
Rosebud Sioux Tribal Airport resides at elevation of 2,724 feet (830 m) above mean sea level. It has one runway designated 16/34 with a concrete surface measuring 4,800 by 75 feet (1,463 x 23 m).

For the 12-month period ending June 19, 2012, the airport had 700 general aviation aircraft operations, an average of 58 per month.

See also 
 Mission Sioux Airport

References

External links 
 

Airports in South Dakota
Buildings and structures in Todd County, South Dakota
Native American airports